Gladwin is a medieval English surname meaning good friend (derived from Old English glæd + wine). Notable people with the surname include:

 Chris Gladwin (cricketer) (born 1962), English cricketer
 Cliff Gladwin (19161988), English cricketer 
 Derek Oliver Gladwin, Baron Gladwin of Clee (19302003), British trade unionist 
 Harold S. Gladwin, American archaeologist, anthropologist and stockbroker
 Henry Gladwin (1729 or 1730–1791), British commander at Fort Detroit when it was besieged during Pontiac's Rebellion
 Joe Gladwin (19061987), British actor
 John Gladwin (born 1942), Bishop of Chelmsford in the Church of England
 Mary E. Gladwin (18611939), American nurse
 Phil Gladwin, television writer and script editor
 Thomas Gladwin (musician) (1710–1799), English composer and musician
 Thomas Gladwin (sheriff) (1629/30–1697), Sheriff of Derbyshire

See also
 Gladwin (disambiguation)#People, for people who use it as a forename
 Gladwyn, for the forename derived from the surname

References